= Duck Village =

Term of Duck Village may refer to:

- Duck Village, square in Somerville, Massachusetts
- Duck Village, tourist attraction in Malta
